Jaime Sommers may refer to:

 Jaime Sommers (The Bionic Woman), the main character in the original 1970s television series
 Jaime Sommers (Bionic Woman), the main character in the 2007 television series
 Jamie Sommers, female MC who appeared with the Wu-Tang Clan